Stéphane Matteau (born September 2, 1969) is a Canadian former professional ice hockey player who played over 800 regular-season games in the National Hockey League (NHL). He was drafted in the second round, 25th overall, by the Calgary Flames in the 1987 NHL Entry Draft.

Playing career
As a member of the New York Rangers 1994 Stanley Cup Championship team, Matteau scored two overtime goals in the Eastern Conference Finals against the New Jersey Devils, including one that ended the series and became an iconic goal in Rangers lore. His first overtime goal ended Game 3 at 6:13 of the second overtime in New Jersey giving the Rangers a 3–2 victory and a 2–1 series lead.

His second goal came at 4:24 of the second overtime of Game 7 at Madison Square Garden. Matteau scored off a wrap around that was intended for a pass to Esa Tikkanen so that Tikkanen could score, only to have it bounced off a stick on the left side of New Jersey's rookie goaltender Martin Brodeur, a play which has been immortalized by the dramatic play-by-play call of Rangers radio announcer Howie Rose: 

Matteau finished his career in 2002–03 with the Florida Panthers and their minor league affiliate, the San Antonio Rampage, and had a career total 742 penalty minutes, 144 goals and 172 assists for 316 total points in 848 games.

Matteau also was a member of the Rouyn Quebec team that played in the Little League World Series in 1982 along with fellow NHL player and first overall pick in his draft, Pierre Turgeon.

Matteau played for head coach Mike Keenan on four separate occasions; with the Blackhawks, Rangers, Blues, and Panthers.

Personal life
Matteau served as an assistant coach with the Blainville-Boisbriand Armada of the QMJHL for two seasons.

Matteau's son, Stefan plays for the Colorado Avalanche. Stefan was drafted 29th overall in the 2012 NHL Entry Draft by the New Jersey Devils, the team against which his father scored his famed goal in the 1994 Eastern Conference Finals.

Matteau's daughter, Alyson plays for the NWHL's Buffalo Beauts.

Matteau represented Canada in the Little League World Series in 1982, along with former NHLer Pierre Turgeon.

Career statistics

References

External links 

1969 births
Calgary Flames draft picks
Calgary Flames players
Canadian ice hockey left wingers
Chicago Blackhawks players
Florida Panthers players
Hull Olympiques players
Living people
New York Rangers players
Salt Lake Golden Eagles (IHL) players
Sportspeople from Rouyn-Noranda
St. Louis Blues players
San Antonio Rampage players
San Jose Sharks players
Stanley Cup champions
Ice hockey people from Quebec